Enrique Talavera Rubio (born 15 January 1967 in Algeciras) is a retired Spanish athlete who competed in sprinting events. He represented his country at the 1988 and 1992 Summer Olympics, as well as three consecutive World Championships.

International competitions

1Competed as a guest

Personal bests
Outdoor
100 metres – 10.23 (+0.7 m/s, Mexico City 1988)
200 metres – 20.79 (+1.4 m/s, Andújar 1990)
Indoor
60 metres – 6.69 (Glasgow 1990)

References

All-Athletics profile

1967 births
Living people
Spanish male sprinters
Sportspeople from Algeciras
Sportspeople from the Province of Cádiz
Athletes (track and field) at the 1988 Summer Olympics
Athletes (track and field) at the 1992 Summer Olympics
World Athletics Championships athletes for Spain
Olympic athletes of Spain
Mediterranean Games silver medalists for Spain
Mediterranean Games medalists in athletics
Athletes (track and field) at the 1987 Mediterranean Games
Athletes (track and field) at the 1991 Mediterranean Games